Paraleucobryum is a genus of mosses belonging to the family Dicranaceae.

The genus was first described by Sextus Otto Lindberg.

The genus has almost cosmopolitan distribution.

Species:
 Paraleucobryum longifolium Loeske, 1908

References

Dicranales
Moss genera